Dehalobacter is a genus in the phylum Bacillota (Bacteria).

Etymology
The generic name Dehalobacter derives from Latin de, from; halogenum from Swedish, coined by Swedish chemist Baron Jöns Jakob Berzelius (1779–1848) from Greek hals, halos "salt" + gen "to produce", so called because a salt is formed in reactions involving these elements; a rod bacter, nominally meaning "a rod", but in effect meaning a bacterium, a rod;  giving Dehalobacter, a halogen-removing, rod-shaped bacterium.

Species 
The genus contains a single species, namely D. restrictus ( Holliger et al. 1998,  type species of the genus. The specific name is from Latin restrictus, limited, restricted, confined, referring to the limited substrate range used. Recently, Dehalobacter sp. UNSWDHB, which dechlorinate chloroform to dichloromethane, and its reductive dehalogenase were identified.

See also 
 Bacterial taxonomy
 Microbiology
 List of bacterial orders
 List of bacteria genera

References 

Peptococcaceae
Monotypic bacteria genera
Bacteria genera